Pestonji Bomanji also known as Pestonjee Bomanjee (1851–1938) was a painter trained in the academic realist style of the Bombay School of Art.

Biography
Bomanji was educated at Elphinstone High School, Bombay. He joined the newly opened J. J. School of Art, Mumbai when he was only thirteen, and studied under the principal John Griffiths. Initially, he wanted to be a sculptor and trained under John Lockwood Kipling. In 1872, Griffiths appointed him as a draughtsman on the team sent by the School to copy the paintings at the Ajanta Caves. He headed the team in 1880. In 1894, he became one of the first Indian teachers at the J.J. School and later also served briefly as its first Indian vice-principal.

A brief apprenticeship under the painter Valentine Cameron Prinsep in 1877 drew him towards portraiture. He established a successful practice portraying members of the wealthy Parsi community to which he belonged. His approach was realistic and unglamourized. Described as 'realistic and warty' by the Times of India, his portraits and other paintings were also compared to the work of Dutch realists.

Bomanji's Parsi heritage is reflected in the depictions of daily and religious life seen in works such as Feeding the Parrot and The Parsi Fire Ceremony. He exhibited at shows around the country. His Parsi Tiger Slayer was deemed the best work by a 'native artist' at the 1889 exhibition of the Bombay Art Society. He won the Governor's Gold Medal at Chennai, Pune and Kolkata, as well as a cash prize of Rs 500 at the 1883 International Exhibition at Kolkata for his Parsi Lady Sewing.

Pestonji Bomanji's son Eruchshaw Pestonji was also an academic painter whose works are in the collection of the National Gallery of Modern Art, New Delhi.

References

Further reading
Art and Nationalism in Colonial India, 1850–1922: Occidental Orientations by Partha Mitter

External links 

1851 births
1938 deaths
Indian male artists
Bombay School
Indian portrait painters
Sir Jamsetjee Jeejebhoy School of Art alumni
Academic staff of Sir J. J. School of Art
19th-century Indian painters
20th-century Indian painters
Parsi people from Mumbai
19th-century Indian male artists
20th-century Indian male artists